Tapumanaia Galu Satele Jr. is an American politician, educator, and government administrator who served as a member of the American Samoa House of Representatives from 2008 to 2012. After leaving the American Samoa Fono, Satele has served in several cabinet positions in the Government of American Samoa.

Early life and education 
Satele was born and raised in Utulei, American Samoa. He earned a Bachelor of Arts degree in general studies from Eastern Oregon University and Master of Education from the University of Hawaiʻi at Mānoa.

Career 
After earning his master's degree, Satele worked as an admissions advisor for Remington College. He also worked as an academic representative for Remington College American Samoa. Satele later served as an administrative services deputy and academic counselor at American Samoa Community College. Satele served as a member of the American Samoa House of Representatives from 2008 to 2012, representing the 15th district. From 2012 to 2016, he served as deputy director of the American Samoa Department of Youth & Women's Affairs. Since 2016, he has served as director of the American Samoa Office of Protection and Advocacy for the Disabled. In 2017, Satele establish the "Love Thy Neighbor" project, delivering 1600 care packages to cannery workers.

In 2020, Satele announced his candidacy for Lieutenant Governor of American Samoa in the 2020 American Samoa gubernatorial election as the running mate of Nuanuaolefeagaiga Saoluaga T. Nua.

Personal life 
Satele is a member of the Church of Jesus Christ of Latter-day Saints. He and his wife, Cassandra Solaita-Satele, have six children. Coming from a political family, both his father Satele Galu Satele Sr., and his grandfather Tuanaitau F. Tuia, served in the American Samoan territorial legislature.

References 

American Samoan educators
American Samoan politicians
Eastern Oregon University alumni
Living people
Members of the American Samoa House of Representatives
University of Hawaiʻi at Mānoa alumni
Year of birth missing (living people)
American Samoan Latter Day Saints